Piecha is a Polish-language surname. Occasionally it may be transliterated from Russian language as Piekha.  

Piecha or Piekha may refer to:

Barbara Piecha (born 1948), Polish luger
Bolesław Piecha (born 1954), Polish politician
Edita Piekha (born 1937),  French-born Soviet and Russian singer and actress of Polish descent
Stas Piekha (born 1980), Russian singer and actor

See also
Piech
Piëch

Polish-language surnames